Welder Ferreira da Cruz, known as Welder (born 24 December 1969) is a former Brazilian football player.

Club career
He made his Primeira Liga debut for Beira-Mar on 21 August 1998 in a game against Braga.

Honours
Beira-Mar
Taça de Portugal: 1998–99

References

External links

 

1969 births
Sportspeople from Espírito Santo
Living people
Brazilian footballers
Desportiva Ferroviária players
Vitória Futebol Clube (ES) players
F.C. Famalicão players
Brazilian expatriate footballers
Expatriate footballers in Portugal
Brazilian expatriate sportspeople in Portugal
Liga Portugal 2 players
S.C. Beira-Mar players
Primeira Liga players
Varzim S.C. players
F.C. Marco players
Leça F.C. players
C.F. União de Lamas players
Estrela do Norte Futebol Clube players
Association football forwards